Mituku (also known as Kinya-Mituku or Metoko) is a Bantu language of the Democratic Republic of the Congo. The Mokpá dialect is distinct.

Tones
It is a tonal language with four tones: high, low, falling and rising. Downstep can occur between two high tones or between a high and falling tone. A contour (rising or falling) tone can occur on a vowel if and only if the vowel is the realization of two underlying vowels.

References

Mbole-Enya languages
Languages of the Democratic Republic of the Congo